Assassin is the third novel of the Samuel Carver series by English thriller writer, Tom Cain, released on 2 July 2009 through Bantam Press.

Plot
This novel takes place twelve years after the previous Samuel Carver novel, The Survivor, with Carver having spent the intervening years as a security consultant. The plot of the novel centres on a copycat killer attempting to implicate Carver in the assassination of America's first black president.

Reception
The book was well received, with critics praising its fast-paced action and complex plot.

Sarah Broadhurst of Love Reading stated that she thinks Cain "comes mighty close" to reaching the standard of thriller writing attained by Lee Child in his Jack Reacher series;a large influence on Cain; and states that the novel is "Terrific stuff. Highly recommended". This praise was echoed by Roddy Brooks, writing for the Coventry Telegraph, who found the finale to be "nerve-jangling"; the novel as a whole to be a "fast-moving thriller"; and stated that "Cain is a master of the genre.".

The Daily Telegraphs Jeremy Jehu was a little more critical. Referring to the twelve-year jump in the characters story, Jehu stated that "[Cain's] solution in this third Carver romp is an act of either outrageous chutzpah or unmitigated cheek."; however also states that "Cain still rattles out a punchy yarn, but fans might well feel taken for a ride – albeit an exciting one.".

References

2009 British novels
British thriller novels
Novels by Tom Cain
Bantam Press books